The Harper County Courthouse, located at 201 N. Jennings Ave. in Anthony, is the seat of government of Harper County, Kansas. Built in 1907, the courthouse replaced a smaller and more modest courthouse and represented the county's prosperity at the time. The construction of the courthouse also settled a lingering controversy over Harper County's seat. George P. Washburn, a prominent Kansas architect, designed the courthouse. The courthouse's design features four corner towers and a clock tower at the center of the building. The west and east entrances to the building feature stone porches. The arched third-story windows of the courthouse are connected by a band of stone encircling the building.

The courthouse was added to the National Register of Historic Places on November 22, 1978.

References

Courthouses on the National Register of Historic Places in Kansas
Government buildings completed in 1908
Buildings and structures in Harper County, Kansas
National Register of Historic Places in Harper County, Kansas
1908 establishments in Kansas